In physics, optically detected magnetic resonance (ODMR) is a double resonance technique by which the electron spin state of a crystal defect may be optically pumped for spin initialisation and readout.

Like electron paramagnetic resonance (EPR), ODMR makes use of the Zeeman effect in unpaired electrons. The negatively charged nitrogen vacancy centre (NV−) has been the target of considerable interest with regards to performing experiments using ODMR.

ODMR of NV−s in diamond has applications in magnetometry and sensing, biomedical imaging, quantum information and the exploration of fundamental physics.

NV ODMR
The nitrogen vacancy defect in diamond consists of a single substitutional nitrogen atom (replacing one carbon atom) and an adjacent gap, or vacancy, in the lattice where normally a carbon atom would be located.

The nitrogen vacancy occurs in three possible charge states: positive (NV+), neutral (NV0) and negative (NV−). As NV− is the only one of these charge states which has shown to be ODMR active, it is often referred to simply as the NV.

The energy level structure of the NV− consists of a triplet ground state, a triplet excited state and two singlet states. Under resonant optical excitation, the NV may be raised from the triplet ground state to the triplet excited state. The centre may then return to the ground state via two routes; by the emission of a photon of 637 nm in the zero phonon line (ZPL) (or longer wavelength from the phonon sideband) or alternatively via the aforementioned singlet states through intersystem crossing and the emission of a 1042 nm photon. A return to the ground state via the latter route will preferentially result in the  state.

Relaxation to the  state necessarily results in a decrease in visible wavelength fluorescence (as the emitted photon is in the infrared range). Microwave pumping at a resonant frequency of  places the centre in the degenerate  state. Sweeping the microwave field through these frequencies results in two characteristic dips in the observed fluorescence, the separation between which enables determination of the strength of the magnetic field .

Hyperfine splitting 

Further splitting in the fluorescence spectrum may occur due to the hyperfine interaction which leads to further resonance conditions and corresponding spectral lines. In NV ODMR, this detailed structure usually originates from nitrogen and carbon-13 atoms near to the defect. These atoms have small magnetic fields which interact with the spectral lines from the NV, causing further splitting.

References

Quantum mechanics
Materials science
Scientific techniques
Spectroscopy